The Great Radio Controversy is the second studio album by American hard rock band Tesla, released in 1989. The album's sound has been described as "glam metal to play inside the cab of a tractor-blusey denim and downright wholesome".

The hit singles "Love Song", "Heaven's Trail (No Way Out)", "Hang Tough" and "The Way It Is" received considerable airplay on MTV's Headbangers Ball, and rocketed the band to stardom.

The album is titled after the controversy about the identity of the inventor of radio. It is posited that Serbian engineer Nikola Tesla (whom the band is named after) is the true inventor of radio, while the Italian Guglielmo Marconi took the credit and is widely regarded as having the title. The album's inner sleeve recounts this story.

The album was certified double platinum by the RIAA on July 23, 1998.

Critical reception
Kirk Blows, reviewer of British music newspaper Music Week gave positive response to the album. He thinks that the album musical material will ″satisfy even the most fastidious rock fan″. He writes, ″There's plenty of light and shade here too, all conveyed with an overwhelming air of confidence from a band set to expand on their promising base″.

Track listing

Personnel
Tesla
 Jeff Keith – vocals
 Tommy Skeoch – guitars, backing vocals
 Frank Hannon – guitars, piano, synthesizer, organ
 Brian Wheat – bass, backing vocals
 Troy Luccketta – drums

Production
 Steve Thompson – producer, mixing at Mediasound, New York City
 Michael Barbiero – producer, engineer, mixing
 George Cowan – additional recording and assistant engineer
 Vic Deyglio – assistant engineer
 George Marino  – mastering at Sterling Sound, New York City
 Barry Diament – CD mastering at BDA, New York City

Charts

Weekly charts

Year-end charts

Singles

Certifications

Accolades

See also
List of glam metal albums and songs

References

Tesla (band) albums
1989 albums
Geffen Records albums